Andrew V. "Rip" King (October 25, 1895 – March 4, 1950) was a professional American football player who played as fullback for six seasons for the Akron Pros, Chicago Cardinals, and Hammond Pros of the National Football League (NFL). He played college football at West Virginia University.

References

External links
Just Sports Stats

1895 births
American football running backs
Akron Pros players
Chicago Cardinals players
Hammond Pros players
West Virginia Mountaineers football players
Players of American football from Tennessee
1950 deaths